Visitors to Cuba must obtain a visa before travel or a tourist card from one of the Cuban diplomatic missions, travel agencies or authorized airlines unless they come from one of the visa exempt countries.

All visitors, including those with Cuban nationality residing outside Cuba, must hold valid return tickets and proof of medical insurance. Non-Cuban passport holders must also provide proof of financial solvency of at least US$50 per day. Visitors from many countries are expected to hold a passport valid for at least two months from the arrival date.

Visa policy map

Cuban nationals
Persons who were born in Cuba must use their Cuban passports for travelling to Cuba, unless they have official documentation to prove that they no longer have Cuban nationality.

Visa exemption
Citizens of the following 19 countries can visit Cuba without a visa, for up to the duration listed below:

Travelling on Duty
Citizens of the following countries who are holders of normal passports are exempt when travelling on duty:

Diplomatic and Service passports

Holders of diplomatic or various categories of service passports (official, service, special, public affairs) issued by the following countries are allowed to enter and remain in Cuba without a visa (allowed period of stay in brackets):

D — diplomatic passports
O — official passports
S — service passports
Sp — special passports
PA — public affairs passports

According to the Ministry of Foreign Affairs of Cuba, Armenia and Moldova are not applying bilateral agreements in practice.  Agreement with Indonesia signed on 26 March 2003 was applied from 17 March 2005 to 17 March 2015.

Future changes 
Visa exemption agreements were signed with the following countries but are not yet ratified :
 – 30 days within year period for ordinary passports

Tourist card required

Citizens of all other countries are required to purchase a Visa / Tourist Card (Visa - Tarjeta de Turista) prior to arrival, which can be acquired from Cuban missions, travel agencies, airlines, or licensed online retailers. A tourist card used to grand a maximum stay of 30 days (90 days for Canadian citizens), but  this has been changed as of 1st of November, 2022 to 90 days for most nationalities and can be extended once for the same period of time in Cuba. Those who fly to Cuba from US airports must purchase a "Pink Tourist Card" which is mainly available in the US and fill an Affidavit form, airlines in the US will be able to provide more information about how to purchase the Pink Tourist Card. These Pink Tourist Cards are needed for everyone flying from the US to Cuba on a direct route. Those who enter Cuba from non-US airports must purchase a "Green Tourist Card", which is often less expensive.

Visa required
Citizens of the following 20 countries are ineligible to obtain a tourist card and must obtain a Cuban visa:

1 - nationals of other countries travelling to Cuba from India also require a visa.

However, they are eligible to travel to Cuba with a tourist card if they also hold a valid visa or permanent residence permit issued by Canada, the United States or an EU member state.

Transit
Passengers in transit are exempt from visa or tourist card requirements if their transit time does not exceed 72 hours. They are allowed to enter Cuba.

Kosovo
Entry and transit is refused to  nationals, even if not leaving the aircraft and proceeding by the same flight.

See also

Visa requirements for Cuban citizens

References

Foreign relations of Cuba
Cuba